Contigo por Siempre is the title of the studio album released by Regional Mexican band Beto y sus Canarios on November 7, 2006.

The album ventures into rancheras, ballads, cumbias,  and charangas.

Track listing 
Track listing from Allmusic:

Chart performance

References

2007 albums
Beto y sus Canarios albums
Tierra Caliente albums